Schilcher is a wine produced solely in the Austrian region of Western Styria (Weststeiermark), in the districts of Deutschlandsberg and Voitsberg, sharing a border with Slovenia and Carinthia to the south and west. The Schilcher wine itself is a distinct rosé made from the indigenous Blauer Wildbacher grape. The colour ranges from a light onion tinge to a deep ruby. The grape was once a wild variety which was said to contain alcohol compounds which, in turn, allegedly would induce wild inebriation, hence its colloquial name Rabiatperle - rabid pearl. The name Schilcher originates from the Middle High German word schillern meaning to radiate with colour.

Wine style
Wine from the Schilcher grape is also used for blending and for the production of sparkling wine. The wine has a strong acidity and is renowned for its exclusive aroma, often associated with strawberries. It should be drunk relatively young at a temperature of 9 to 11 °C accompanied with traditional Austrian cold cured meats. Authentic Schilcher wine must carry the official emblem of the white horse (referring to the Lipizzans bred in Piber for the world-famous Spanish Riding School in Vienna) and also carry the official certification number of denomination.

References

Rosé wines
Austrian wine
Economy of Styria